The Shadow Lines (1988) is a Sahitya Akademi Award-winning novel by  Indian writer Amitav Ghosh. It is a book that captures perspective of time and events, of lines that bring people together and hold them apart; lines that are clearly visible from one perspective and nonexistent from another; lines that exist in the memory of one, and therefore in another's imagination. A narrative built out of an intricate, constantly crisscrossing web of memories of many people, it never pretends to tell a story. Instead, it invites the reader to invent one, out of the memories of those involved, memories that hold mirrors of differing shades to the same experience.

The novel is set against the backdrop of historical events like the Swadeshi movement, Second World War, Partition of India and Communal riots of 1963-64 in Dhaka and Calcutta.

The novel earned Ghosh the 1989 Sahitya Akademi Award for English, by the Sahitya Akademi, India's National Academy of Letters. The novel was translated by Shalini Topiwala into Gujarati In 1998.

Plot summary
Split into two parts ('Going Away' and 'Coming Home'), the novel follows the life of a young boy growing up in Calcutta, who is educated in Delhi and then follows with the experiences he has in London.

His family – the Datta Chaudhuris - and the Price family in London are linked by the friendship between their respective patriarchs – Justice Datta Chaudhuri and Lionel Tresawsen. The narrator adores Tridib, his uncle, because of his tremendous knowledge and his perspective of the incidents and places. Tha'mma thinks that Tridib is the type of person who seems 'determined to waste his life in idle self-indulgence', one who refuses to use his family connections to establish a career. Unlike his grandmother, the narrator loves listening to Tridib.

For the narrator, Tridib's lore is very different from the collection of facts and figures. The narrator is sexually attracted to Ila but his feelings are passive. He never expresses his feelings to her afraid to lose the relationship that exists between them. However, one day he involuntarily shows his feelings when she, unaware of his feelings for her, undresses in front of him. She feels sorry for him but immediately abandons him to visit Nick's (the Price family's son, and the man who she later marries) bedroom. Tha'mma does not like Ila; she continually asks the narrator "Why do you always speak for that whore?" Tha'mma has a dreadful past and wants to reunite her family and goes to Dhaka to bring back her uncle. Tridib is in love with May and sacrificed his life to rescue her from mobs in the communal riots of 1963–64 in Dhaka.

Characters
 Tridib  – The protagonist is a middle class boy who grows up in a middle-class  family; he is the narrator's uncle. He is in love with May.
 Tha'mma (the narrator's grandmother)  – She was the headmistress of a girls' school in Calcutta. She is a very strict, disciplined, hard-working, mentally strong and patient lady. She is the one who wants to bring her uncle, Jethamoshai, to India to live with her, eventually leading to his and Tridib's deaths by a mob in Dhaka.
 Ila  – She is the narrator's cousin who lives in Stockwell, London. The narrator is in love with her, but she marries Nick.
 May  – She is the Price family's daughter. She is in love with Tridib and blames herself for his death.
 Nick  – He is the Price family's son, distinguishable by his long blond hair. He wants to work in the 'futures industry'. He marries Ila during the course of the novel, but it is later found that he is allegedly having an affair. He worked in Kuwait for a brief period of time but quit his job (it is implied that he may have been fired for embezzlement).
 Mayadebi  – She is the narrator's grandmother's younger sister and Tridib's mother.

Awards
 The Shadow Lines won the Sahitya Akademi Award & the Ananda Puraskar.

Footnotes

Further reading
 Roy, Pinaki (2012). " Coming Home: Passage from Anglophilia to Indocentrism in Amitav Ghosh's The Shadow Lines". Postmodern Indian English Fiction. Ed. Kaushik, A.S. Jaipur: Aadi Publications. Pp. 62–77. .

1988 novels
1988 Indian novels
Sahitya Akademi Award-winning works
Novels set in Delhi
Novels set in Kolkata
Novels set in London
Novels by Amitav Ghosh
Indian historical novels in English
Novels set in British India
Novels set during World War II
Partition of India in fiction
Novels set in the 1960s
Dhaka in fiction